Fernand Feyearts (1880 – 11 July 1927 in Brussels) was a Belgian swimmer and water polo player who competed for Belgium at the 1900 Summer Olympics and the 1908 Summer Olympics, winning a silver medal in each.

Between 1898-1900, Feyearts was one of the main people responsible for the development of water polo in Belgium, and in 1900, his club the Brussels Swimming and Water Polo Club, traveled to Paris, France, to compete in the 1900 Summer Olympics, after beating French clubs in the first two rounds, his team met the Osbourne Swimming Club who were representing Great Britain in the final, but unfortunately in front of 5000 spectators they lost 2-7, so he won a silver medal.

Feyearts was back at the Olympics eight years later competing for Belgium, at the 1908 Summer Olympics being held in London, in the first round Belgium beat the Netherlands 8-1, with Feyearts scoring six of those goals, in the next round they beat Sweden 8-4, with Feyearts scoring another point, so again they had reached the final and again they were against Great Britain, but again he had to settle for silver medal as they were beaten 2-9, Feyearts scored again and was the tournaments top scorer.

Feyearts also competed in the 100 metre freestyle at the 1908 Summer Olympics, but failed to finish in the top two, so didn't qualify for the next round.

Feyearts became a volunteer during World War I, but in 1917 he was severely wounded and ten years later died of those injuries in 1927.

See also
 List of Olympic medalists in water polo (men)

References

External links
 

1880 births
1927 deaths
Belgian male freestyle swimmers
Belgian male water polo players
Olympic swimmers of Belgium
Olympic water polo players of Belgium
Olympic silver medalists for Belgium
Water polo players at the 1900 Summer Olympics
Water polo players at the 1908 Summer Olympics
Swimmers at the 1908 Summer Olympics
Olympic medalists in water polo
Medalists at the 1908 Summer Olympics
Medalists at the 1900 Summer Olympics
Sportspeople from Brussels
Belgian male long-distance swimmers
Place of birth missing